The 2023 Raiders Tirol season is the second season of the Raiders Tirol team in the third season of the European League of Football. The semifinalist of last season was will compete again in the Central Conference, the first time without its longterm rival Vienna Vikings.

Preseason
After the departure of franchise legend Sean Shelton, retiring and becoming sporting director of the Munich Ravens, the organization was looking for a new franchise quarterback and found the Canadian Christion Strong of the German club Cologne Crocodiles.

Regular season

Standings

Roster

Transactions
From Frankfurt Galaxy: Ja'Len Embry
From Vienna Vikings: Sebastian Huber

Staff

Notes

References

Raiders Tirol
Raiders Tirol
Raiders Tirol